Issac Blakeney (born November 18, 1992) is American football wide receiver who is currently a free agent. He played college football at Duke University

Professional career

Washington Redskins
Blankeney signed to the practice squad of the Washington Redskins on October 5, 2015. He was released on October 16, 2015.

Pittsburgh Steelers

On February 4, 2016, Blakeney signed a futures contract with the Pittsburgh Steelers. On August 28, he was waived by the Steelers.

References

Living people
1992 births
American football wide receivers
Duke Blue Devils football players
San Francisco 49ers players
Washington Redskins players
Pittsburgh Steelers players
Players of American football from North Carolina
People from Monroe, North Carolina